Fourcade may refer to:

Art 
 Denning & Fourcade, Inc., French interior design firm

Geography 
 Fourcade Glacier, glacier at the head of Potter Cove, Maxwell Bay, King George Island
 Mount Fourcade, mountain standing 2 nautical miles (3.7 km) southwest of Cape Anna and Anna Cove on the west coast of Graham Land

People 
Fourcade is one of several orthographic variants, that began to appear in the 17th century, of the ancient family name Forcade. The name has its origins in the 12th century, in the Kingdom of Navarre, in particular in Béarn in Lower Navarre, after they separated in 1512. Several noble branches of the family were Huguenots following the Reformation in early 16th century Béarn and emigrated to the Kingdom of Prussia, the Netherlands and other Protestant countries following the Edict of Fontainebleau, which revoked the Edict of Nantes in 1685.

 Bertrand Fourcade (b. 1942), French rugby union player, coach and sports director
 Chase Fourcade (b. 1997), American football quarterback, nephew of John Fourcade
 Henry Georges Fourcade (1865–1948), French surveyor, forester, pioneer of photogrammetry and botanist
 Jean-Pierre Fourcade (b. 1929), French politician
 John Fourcade (b. 1960), American football quarterback, uncle of Chase Fourcade
 Marceau Fourcade (1905–????), French rower 
 Marie-Madeleine Fourcade (1909–1989), leader of the French Resistance network "Alliance"
 Martin Fourcade (b. 1988), French biathlete 
 Simon Fourcade (b. 1984), French biathlete
 Vincent Fourcade (1934–1992), French interior designer
 Xavier Fourcade (1927–1987), French American contemporary art dealer

See also
Lafourcade, a related surname

Surnames of French origin